Gary Thomas Johns (born 29 August 1952) is an Australian writer and former politician. He was a member of the House of Representatives from 1987 to 1996, holding the Queensland seat of Petrie for the Australian Labor Party (ALP). He served as a minister in the Keating Government.

Early life
Johns was born in Melbourne on 29 August 1952. He is the youngest of four sons born to Doris and Claude Johns; his father was a painter. He holds the degree of Bachelor of Economics and Master of Arts from Monash University. He tutored in geography at Melbourne State College.

Political career
Johns joined the ALP in 1972. He worked as an organiser with the national secretariat of the ALP from 1978 to 1982, working under national secretaries David Combe and Bob McMullan.

Johns was elected as the member for Petrie in 1987, and held it for the Australian Labor Party until his defeat in 1996.  He served as Assistant Minister for Industrial Relations from December 1993 and Special Minister of State and Vice-President of the Executive Council from March 1994 until the defeat of the Keating government in 1996, in which he lost his seat to Liberal candidate Teresa Gambaro.

Later career
Since his defeat, Johns has drifted from the ALP and has been critical of his old party. Johns told Brett Evans that he might still be a member of the ALP but Evans says that in Johns' heart he has moved on from the ALP. Johns now describes himself as a "small-l liberal".

From 1997 to 2006, he was a senior fellow at the neo-liberal/conservative think tank the Institute of Public Affairs (IPA).  Within the IPA, he was head of the Non-Government Organisations unit. From 2006-2009 Johns worked with a consultancy firm, ACIL Tasman. In 2009 he was appointed Associate Professor of Public Policy at the Australian Catholic University's Public Policy Institute. In 2012 he was appointed visiting fellow at QUT Business School. He was president of the Bennelong Society, an organisation that advocated the provision of welfare for Indigenous Australians under the same rules as for all other Australians. From 2002-2004 he was appointed Associate Commissioner of the Commonwealth Productivity Commission, an Australian government policy research and advisory body, with the responsibility for an inquiry into the national workers’ compensation and occupational health and safety framework.

He was awarded a PhD in political science in 2001 from the University of Queensland, in 2002 the Fulbright Professional Award in Australian-United States Alliance Studies, Georgetown University in Washington D.C., and in 2003 the Centenary Medal for ‘service to Australian society through the advancement of economic, social and political issues’.

He is a columnist for The Australian newspaper, the author of numerous papers and books: Waking up to Dreamtime. Media Masters (2001), Aboriginal Self-determination. Connor Court (2011), No Contraception, No Dole. Connor Court (2016), The Charity Ball. Connor Court (2014), Right Social Justice. Connor Court (2012), Really Dangerous Ideas. Connor Court (2013), and Recognise What? Connor Court (2014).

In 2017 Johns was appointed by the Turnbull Government as the commissioner of the Australian Charities and Not-for-profits Commission. His appointment was publicly criticised by David Crosbie, the CEO of the Communities Council for Australia, who said he had made "numerous public statements that clearly indicate he is opposed to many charities and their work". He resigned in June 2022 following the Albanese Government's election to office.

In 2023 Johns was a committee member of Recognise a Better Way, a group arguing the "No" case regarding the Albanese government's proposal for Indigenous Voice to Parliament.

Lobby for free speech
As a director of the conservative 'think-tank' the Australian Institute for Progress, Johns was an advocate for free speech, hence the book, 'Throw Open the Doors'. Around 2016, he also worked for the International Tax and Investment Center (ITIC), a policy institute that received funding from the tobacco industry. As a consultant for the ITIC Johns was scathing of the anti-smoking Southeast Asia Tobacco Control Alliance, calling it "an instrument of the World Health Organisation".

Bibliography

Books

Aboriginal Self-determination: The Whiteman's Dream. Connor Court, 2011.
Right Social Justice. Connor Court, 2012.
Really Dangerous Ideas. Connor Court, 2013.
Recognize What? Connor Court, 2014.
The Charity Ball. Connor Court, 2014.
No Contraception, No Dole: Tackling Intergenerational Welfare. Connor Court, 2016.
Throw Open the Doors: The World Health Organization Framework Convention on Tobacco Control. Connor Court, 2016.
"Your Body Belongs to the Nation" & Other Public Health Lobby Errors. Connor Court, 2016.
The Burden of Culture. Quadrant Books, 2022.

References

Further reading 
 

1952 births
Living people
20th-century Australian politicians
20th-century Australian writers
21st-century Australian writers
Australian Labor Party members of the Parliament of Australia
Australian columnists
Members of the Australian House of Representatives for Petrie
Members of the Australian House of Representatives
Quadrant (magazine) people
Recipients of the Centenary Medal
University of Queensland alumni